Seibert Straughn (born 31 October 1967, in Saint Philip) is a retired Barbadian sprinter who specialized in the 400 metres.

He won the bronze medal at the 1989 Central American and Caribbean Championships. He also competed at the Olympic Games in 1988 and 1992 as well as the 1991 World Championships.

His personal best time was 45.61 seconds, achieved in May 1989 in Bridgetown.

References

External links

1967 births
Living people
Barbadian male sprinters
Athletes (track and field) at the 1988 Summer Olympics
Athletes (track and field) at the 1992 Summer Olympics
Olympic athletes of Barbados
Athletes (track and field) at the 1990 Commonwealth Games
Commonwealth Games competitors for Barbados
Athletes (track and field) at the 1991 Pan American Games
Pan American Games competitors for Barbados
Central American and Caribbean Games medalists in athletics